Borrowash Methodist Church is in Borrowash. Derbyshire.

History

The church was built by the contractor Henry Vernon of Derby, to designs by John Wills, who in the same year built an almost identical chapel in Beeston - (see Queen's Road Methodist Church). The church was opened on 30 May 1900.

The building was designed for 415 people and cost around £2,250 (equivalent to £ in ).

Organ

The church has a pipe organ by J.H. Adkins of Derby from 1920. A specification of the organ can be found on the National Pipe Organ Register.

References

Churches completed in 1900
Gothic Revival church buildings in England
Gothic Revival architecture in Derbyshire
Methodist churches in Derbyshire